Abba Alhaji Kyari (born 17 March 1975) is a Nigerian police officer who is a Deputy Commissioner of Police currently on suspension and relieved from all police duties pending the outcome of an internal investigation into his alleged connection with Gucci King, popular alleged fraudster Ramon Abbas "Hushpuppi". He is a member of the International Association of Chiefs of Police (IACP). Prior to his appointment as IGP-IRT, he served at Lagos State Police Command as a unit Commander in one of the PMF bases located in Lagos before he was promoted and transferred to serve as the Officer-In-Charge of the dis-banded Special Anti-Robbery Squad (SARS).

Career
Kyari was admitted into Police Academy Wudil, Kano State in 2000, he graduated as cadet Assistance Superintendent of Police (ASP) and was posted to Adamawa State Police Command for his one-year mandatory attachment in Song Police Division. He was later deployed as Divisional Crime Officer (DCO) in Numan, Adamawa State, Kyari also served as Unit Commander 14 PMF Yola. He moved to Lagos State Police Command as 2 IC and later Officer-In-Charge of SARS. Until the revelation of his engagement with the infamous alleged Nigerian fraudster (Ramon Abbas) popularly known as Hushpuppi, Kyari was the head of the  Inspector General of Police’s Intelligence Response Team in the Nigerian Police Force Headquarters in Abuja.

Involvement with Hushpuppi 
On 29 July 2021, infamous Nigerian fraudster (Ramon Abbas) popularly known as Hushpuppi, who is currently serving an 11 years prison sentence in the United States for money laundering and cybercrimes, the implicated Kyari as a party in an international scheme to defraud a Qatari school founder and then launder over $1.1 million in illicit proceeds.

A 69 page court document outlined a dispute among members of the crime syndicate which allegedly prompted one Vincent to contact the victim and claim that Abbas and Juma (also a fraudster) were engaged in fraud. After this, Abbas allegedly arranged to have Vincent jailed in Nigeria by Kyari. The document further provided that Kyari allegedly sent Abbas account details into which he could deposit payment for Vincent's arrest and imprisonment.

A report by Peoples Gazette highlighted how Kyari travelled to Dubai on the invitation of Hushpuppi and was treated to a good time with airport pickup, luxury hotel accommodation and city tour.

Kyari, however, disputed these serious allegations leveled against him via his verified Instagram and Facebook accounts. A report by Peoples Gazette showed that the United States Department of Justice had issued a warrant of arrest and ordered Kyari's extradition. The IGP however suspended him pending the report from the committee in charge of investigation.

Suspension
On 1 August 2021, the Inspector General of Police announced the suspension of Kyari from duty pending the determination of investigation of his involvement in the Hushpuppi fraud.
In December 2021, the Inspector-General of Police, Usman Baba, submitted the probe panel report on Kyari to the Police Service Commission.

Cocaine deal allegation 
On 14 February 2022, a video clip of Kyari was exposed where he negotiated the release of some quantity of seized 25 kg cocaine, and offered $61,400 cash.
On 7 March 2022, Kyari and six others were arraigned by the NDLEA on several charges bordering on conspiracy, obstruction and dealing in cocaine. However, Kyari and four others, who are police officers as well, pleaded not guilty to the charges brought against them by the anti-narcotics agency.

References

External links
 Biography of Abba Kyari

 

Nigerian police officers
People from Borno State
People from Yobe State
University of Maiduguri alumni
1975 births
Living people